In ancient Egypt, a stolist was a person who held the rank of priest and is now understood to have been an adorner of divine images. At some time, stolists belonged to a group or guild known as nekrostolisteis, as is attested to by the archaeological finds of the Siwa Oasis, this particularly being an inscription dating to the 1st century CE.

References

Ancient Egyptian funerary practices